The A57 autoroute is a motorway in south eastern France.

It is 55 km long and runs from the Tunnel de Toulon to the A8 near Le Luc. The road is a toll motorway north of Toulon. It is operated by ESCOTA. It connects with the A570 spur  to the town of Hyères. The motorway traverses the Massif des Maures and is mainly 2x2 lanes. The western terminus of the motorway links directly to the Toulon tunnel and onward to the A50 autoroute and Marseille.

Junctions  

Exchange A8-A57 Junction with A8 to Aix and Nice.
13 (Le Luc) Towns served: Le Luc, DN7
Service Area:  Repenti
12 (Le Luca) Towns served: Le Luc, Gonfaron (under construction)
11 (Carnoules) Towns served: Carnoules, Pignans
Rest Area: Suvé du Vent
Péage de Cuers
10 (Cuers-Nord) Towns served: Cuers, Pierrefeu-du-Var, Brignoles
09 (Cuers-Sud) Towns served: Cuers
08 (Sainte-Christine) Towns served: Sainte-Christine
07 (Solliès-Toucas) Towns served: Solliès-Toucas, Les Terrins
06 (La Farlède) Towns served: La Farlède, La Crau
Service Area: La Chamberte
Exchange A57-A570 Junction with A570 spur onto Hyères and Le Lavandou.
05 (La Pauline) Towns served: La Pauline
04 (La Garde) Towns served: La Valette-du-Var, La Garde
03 (Toulon La Valette) Towns served: Toulon
02 (Toulon Est) Towns served: Toulon, Giens via D559
01a (Toulon-Centre) Towns served: Toulon
Exchange A57-A50 Junction with D559 to the A50 towards Aubagne and Marseille.

History 
 1968 : Opening of the first section Toulon to La-Valette-du-Var then numbered the A54.
 2014 (March, 18th) : The tunnel de Toulon (Toulon's tunnel) opens its second section, in the Toulon -> Marseille direction (the first section, Marseille -> Toulon, is closed for several months for maintenance and improvements).
 2018 : The 2x2 lane section between Toulon Tunnel and A570 is currently due to be widened to 3 lanes in each direction in order to address the perennial traffic jams during rush hour on this section. The land required for the widening has been allocated and the work is due to commence in 2018.

References

External links
 A57 Motorway in Saratlas

A57